John Evan Stambaugh (born August 24, 1939, in Harrisburg, Pennsylvania – died June 6, 1990, in Williamstown, Massachusetts) was an American classical scholar and professor at Williams College.

Stambaugh was educated at Trinity College and then at Princeton University, earning a Ph.D. in 1967. Stambaugh taught at Williams from 1965 until 1990 and was a specialist in the field of Greco-Roman religion as well as early Christianity. In addition to teaching at Williams, Stambaugh was a fellow of the American School of Classical Studies in Athens, Greece. and a faculty and managing committee member and chair of the Intercollegiate Center for Classical Studies in Rome, Italy.

Publications

Books
 1972. Serapis under the early Ptolemies. Leiden: E. J. Brill.
 1988. The ancient Roman city. Baltimore: Johns Hopkins University Press.

Articles
 1978. "The Functions of Roman Temples." In Religion (Heidentum: Römische Religion, Allgemeines)  ANRW II.16.1, edited by Wolfgang Haase, 554–608. Berlin: Walter De Gruyter.

Biography
 Fuqua, C. 1994. "Stambaugh, John Evan." In Biographical dictionary of North American classicists, edited by W. Briggs, 609–10. Westport, Conn. : Greenwood Press.

References

1939 births
1990 deaths
American classical scholars
Princeton University alumni
Williams College faculty